A number of steamships were named Perelle, including:

, a Guernsey coaster in service 1929–42
, a Guernsey coaster in service 1954–62

Ship names